The Bishop of Leicester is the Ordinary of the Church of England Diocese of Leicester in the Province of Canterbury.

Through reorganisation within the Church of England, the Diocese of Leicester was refounded in 1927, and St Martin's Church became Leicester Cathedral. The present bishop's residence is Bishop's Lodge, Knighton, south Leicester. Martyn Snow became Bishop of Leicester with the confirmation of his election on 22 February 2016.

Bishops of Leicester

Assistant bishops

Other assistant (or coadjutor) bishops of the diocese include:
19351949 (ret.): John Willis, former Bishop of Uganda
19491955 (d.): Francis Hollis, Vicar of Stanford with Swinford, Leicestershire and Senior Canon of Leicester; former Bishop of Labuan and Sarawak
19501965 (ret.): Alexander Maxwell, Vicar of Copt Oak (until 1952), of Ab Kettleby with Wartnaby and Holwell (1952–1959), Rector of Swithland (from 1959); former Assistant Bishop of West/ern Szechwan. Harold Alexander Maxwell (17 December 189730 December 1975), CMS missionary in China. Made deacon on St Thomas' Day (21 December) 1923 and ordained priest the following St Thomas' Day, 21 December 1924; both times by, Albert David, Bishop of Liverpool, at Liverpool Cathedral.
19721997 (d.): John Mort, former Bishop of Northern Nigeria (1952–1969), Canon Treasurer of Leicester Cathedral (1970–1988)
19661973 (ret.): Geoffrey Stuart Smith, Rector of Swithland, former Bishop of North Kerala and Assistant Bishop of Chelmsford

Cecil de Carteret, former Bishop of Jamaica, was appointed to serve as assistant-bishop from 1932, but he died in ill-health on 3 January, unable to take up the appointment.

Honorary assistant bishops — retired bishops taking on occasional duties voluntarily — have included:
1999–2011 (res.): Colin Scott, retired Bishop of Hulme

Sources
Notes

Bibliography

 

Bishops of Leicester
Leicester
Bishops
Diocese of Leicester